WASCE may refer to

 IBM WebSphere Application Server Community Edition
 West African Senior School Certificate Examination